Rudolf Mitteregger (born 27 November 1944) is a retired cyclist from Austria. He competed at the 1972 Summer Olympics and the 1976 Summer Olympics.

References

External links
 

1944 births
Living people
Austrian male cyclists
Olympic cyclists of Austria
Cyclists at the 1972 Summer Olympics
Cyclists at the 1976 Summer Olympics
People from Murtal District
Sportspeople from Styria
20th-century Austrian people